Andrea Giordano (born 17 July 1976) is an Argentine gymnast. She competed in five events at the 1992 Summer Olympics.

References

1976 births
Living people
Argentine female artistic gymnasts
Olympic gymnasts of Argentina
Gymnasts at the 1992 Summer Olympics
Place of birth missing (living people)